Good Luck is the debut studio album by Big D and the Kids Table.

Track listing 
 "Myself" – 2:33
 "5 Kids Down" – 2:16
 "G.L.D." – 2:02
 "Are You Just Scared?" – 1:46
 "Fatman" – 3:17
 "She Won't Ever Figure it Out" – 2:26
 "Take Another Look" – 2:36
 "Find Out" – 4:22
 "Can't Be Caught" – 2:55
 "I'd Rather" – 2:45
 "Apology" – 0:51
 "Dirt Lip" – 2:34
 "Learning To Listen" – 2:04
 "51 Gardner" – 5:21
 "Good Luck" – 4:21

Track 5 – Fatman is a new version of "Phatmothafucka" on the album Porch Life.

Credits
Chris Bush — tenor saxophone
Gabe Feenberg — trombone
Marc 'The Skipper' Flynn — vocals, trumpet, valve trombone
Steve Foote — bass
Jon Lammi — guitar
Max MacVeety — drums
David McWane — vocals
Sean P. Rogan — guitar
Chris Sallen — tenor saxophone
Dan Stoppelman  — trumpet

References

1999 albums
Asian Man Records albums
Big D and the Kids Table albums